Maeno (written: 前野) is a Japanese surname. Notable people with the surname include:

, Japanese actor
, Japanese samurai
, Japanese footballer
, Japanese voice actor

Japanese-language surnames